Aaron Francisco (born July 5, 1983) is a former American football safety. He was signed by the Arizona Cardinals as an undrafted free agent in 2005. He played college football at BYU.

He was also a member of the Carolina Panthers, Indianapolis Colts and Detroit Lions.

Early years
Aaron Francisco attended Kahuku High School in Kahuku, Hawai'i (Oahu), and was an All State and All Oahu Interscholastic Association (OIA) selection as a senior. Francisco helped to lead Kahuku to their first State Championship in 2000.

College career
He recorded 88 tackles (43 solo) as a senior in 2004 at BYU. He finished his career with 330 tackles (167 solo) and seven interceptions and was named first-team All-Mountain West Conference selection as a junior in 2003.

Professional career

Arizona Cardinals 
Francisco signed with the Cardinals as an undrafted free agent in 2005. Francisco was famously defending Santonio Holmes on the Steelers' game winning touchdown in the 2008 Super Bowl, a play which made the cover of Sports Illustrated.

Detroit Lions 
Francisco signed with the Detroit Lions on August 17, 2011. He was released by the Lions on September 3, 2011.

Tennessee Titans
Francisco signed a one-year deal with the Tennessee Titans on July 20, 2012. He was waived by the Titans on August 31, 2012.

References

External links
Tennessee Titans bio
BYU Cougars football bio 

1983 births
Living people
Players of American football from Hawaii
American football safeties
BYU Cougars football players
Arizona Cardinals players
Indianapolis Colts players
Carolina Panthers players
Detroit Lions players
Tennessee Titans players